The right of expatriates to vote in elections in their country of origin varies depending on the legislation of an expatriate's country of origin. Some countries (such as France) grant their expatriate citizens unlimited voting rights, identical to those of citizens living in their home country. Other countries allow expatriate citizens to vote only for a certain number of years after leaving the country, after which they are no longer eligible to vote (e.g. 25 years for Germany). Other countries reserve the right vote solely to citizens living in that country, thereby stripping expatriate citizens of their voting rights once they leave their home country (such as Ireland, with extremely limited exceptions).

Expatriates' voting rights in local elections sometimes vary within individual countries, usually those with federal systems, such as Switzerland and the United States. For example, Swiss expatriates originally hailing from certain cantons may vote in elections at cantonal level, while those from other cantons may not. The issue has been raised by European Union institutions, particularly in relation to citizens of one EU state resident in another.

As of 2006, 93 countries allowed their expatriate citizens to vote: 21 African countries, 13 countries in the Americas, 15 Asian countries, 6 Pacific countries, and 36 European countries.

According to an extensive and thorough research published in 2007, out of researched 214 countries and territories, 115 had provisions for external voting.

By jurisdiction

Australia 
Australian citizens living abroad may vote if they register to vote within three years of leaving and intend to return to Australia within six years of leaving. Australians who were under 18 when they left Australia may vote if they intend to return to Australia within six years of their 18th birthday. Voting may be done by post or at an Australian embassy, consulate or high commission. Unlike for Australians living in Australia, voting is not compulsory for expatriate Australians.

Austria 
Austrian citizens living abroad may vote by post in Austrian presidential and parliamentary elections, as well as referendums, with no expiry date. They must enrol on a dedicated foreign voters' register and must renew their registration every ten years.

Belgium 
As of 2017, Belgian citizens living abroad can register to vote for elections to the Chamber of Representatives and the European Parliament. Once registered in a consular post (which is optional), the person is subject to compulsory voting. Expatriates cannot vote in regional or local elections.

The very first legislation regarding eligible Belgians abroad was implemented during 1919–25 to accommodate Belgian military stationed in German territories after World War I. Their votes were cast on an earlier date and sent to their corresponding electoral district in Belgium.

The first modern law, the law of 18 December 1998, gave Belgians living abroad the right to vote in federal elections (i.e. for the Chamber and Senate). However, the law was inadequate and not generally applied.

The law of 7 March 2002 improved the procedure. Belgians abroad could register in a municipality of their choice, determining the constituency in which their vote would be cast. In practice, most votes were cast in the linguistically sensitive Brussels-Halle-Vilvoorde constituency.

The sixth Belgian state reform (ca. 2012), which also abolished the Brussels-Halle-Vilvoorde constituency and direct Senate elections, replaced the free choice by an objectively defined municipality (where the person last lived, or else further criteria apply).

The law of 17 November 2016 slightly changed the procedure, and also extended the right to vote for European Parliament elections to Belgians living in a non-EU member state. Belgians living in another EU member state already had the right to vote on Belgian lists in European Parliament elections.

On 26 August 2016, the cabinet also approved the right to vote in regional elections; however, this change is subject to approval by special majority in parliament, causing the measure to stall.

Brazil 
Brazilian citizens living abroad aged between 18 and 70 must vote, as Brazil's policy of compulsory voting includes expatriate Brazilians. Voting is possible, but not mandatory, for Brazilian expatriates aged over 70 or under 18 (Brazil's minimum voting age is 16). Brazilian voters abroad cast ballots only for presidential elections.

Canada 
Per Bill C-76, Canadian expatriates may vote in federal elections by post or in person, no matter how long they've lived outside the country.

Previously, Canadian law dictated that citizens living abroad could only vote by post if they had lived outside the country for less than five consecutive years (citizens that worked for the Canadian government, a Canadian company or an international organisation in which Canada was involved were exempt from this rule). On 11 January 2019, the Supreme Court of Canada, after deliberating the case of Frank v Canada for which the Ontario Court of Appeal had upheld these restrictions, struck down the restrictions. The Supreme Court of Canada ruling affirmed the rights of long-term expats to vote.

Citizens living abroad have always maintained their eligibility to vote in person if possible.

Chile 
Chilean expatriates have the right to vote in presidential elections (primaries, first and second round) and national referendums in the consulate where they registered. The law allowing expatriate Chilean citizens the right to vote was presented by President Michelle Bachelet and approved by Congress in August 2016. The primaries for the 2017 presidential election were the first time that expatriates were allowed to vote.

Colombia 

Regardless of their time living abroad, Colombian expatriates enjoy full voting rights in national referendums, presidential and parliamentary elections. One member of the House of Representatives comes from the international constituency and is elected exclusively by citizens living abroad. In order to vote, Colombian citizens have to register in their respective consulate or embassy in the established periods before the election dates.

Costa Rica

Costa Rican citizens can vote for president and national referendums regardless of their time living abroad since Electoral Code's reform of 2010. They can't, however, vote in local elections which includes deputies and municipal authorities. The first time this was implemented was in the 2014 Costa Rican general election. Costa Ricans vote in the respective consulate or embassy and have to register their location a year before the election.

Czech Republic

Czech citizens living abroad may participate in parliamentary elections.  Their votes must be cast at polling stations.  For the 2021 election, Czech expats are trying to raise awareness of the difficulty to attend polling stations to call for the ability to vote by post.

Denmark 
Danish citizens who leave Denmark may vote in parliamentary elections, referendums and EU Parliament elections (but not local elections) for two years after their move, after which they are disenfranchised unless and until they move back. There are exceptions granting indefinite overseas voting rights for certain categories of expatriates, primarily those working for the Danish government or on job assignments for Danish employers.

For EU Parliament elections, Danish citizens living in EU countries may continue to vote indefinitely.

Danes Worldwide wishes to improve voting rights for citizens abroad, and favors amending the Constitution to do so.

Dominican Republic 
Dominican citizens abroad can vote for presidential and legislative elections. Seven seats in the Chamber of Deputies are reserved for the expat community, with three of them corresponding to the United States and Canada, two to Latin America and the Caribbean and another two to Europe. This is contemplated in the constitution since 2010 and was first implemented in the 2012 Dominican presidential election.

Finland
Finnish citizens living abroad are eligible to vote in Parliamentary elections and presidential elections.  They may also vote in the elections for the European Parliament provided they have not registered to vote in their country of residence.

France 

French citizens living abroad enjoy full voting rights in presidential and parliamentary elections, regardless of how long they have lived abroad.

France has a dedicated Assembly of French Citizens Abroad, the president of which is the French Foreign Minister. France also has a system of 11 constituencies for French residents overseas, each of which are represented by a deputy who sits in the National Assembly.

Germany 
Article 12(2)(1) of the Federal Voting Act states that German citizens who live abroad and have no residence in Germany may vote in German parliamentary elections and European Parliament elections if:

a)     they have resided in Germany for an uninterrupted period of at least three months since their 14th birthday and within the last 25 years; or

b)     they have a close personal and direct relationship with German politics and are personally affected by political developments in Germany.

Guinea-Bissau 
Guinea-Bissau has two overseas constituencies - one for Africa (Senegal, Gambia, Guinea, Cape Verde and Mauritania) and one for Europe (Portugal, Spain, France, Belgium and England).

Greece 
Expatriate Greek citizens are allowed to vote in home country elections under certain conditions.

India 
Expatriate Indian citizens have been allowed to vote in all Indian elections since 2010, provided that they have not acquired the citizenship of another country (India does not permit dual nationality). However, overseas voters must be physically present at their original constituency to vote, making it infeasible for most expatriates to actually cast their votes.

Ireland 

At most elections in the Republic of Ireland the electoral register is based on residential address, and the only nonresident voters are those serving abroad on government business; this includes Irish diplomats and their spouses, and Defence Forces and Garda Síochána personnel but not their spouses. An exception is in elections to the Seanad (upper house) for which graduates voting in the university constituencies (National University of Ireland and Dublin University) may be nonresident. Expatriates intending to return to Ireland within eighteen months may retain their Irish address for electoral purposes, but must be present to vote in person.  Since the 1990s there have been proposals to allow emigrants to vote in elections to the Dáil (lower house) or Seanad, generally via a dedicated (single transferable vote multi-seat) constituency. 
In 2017 the government agreed to allow expatriate citizens to vote in presidential elections and promised a constitutional referendum to be held alongside the 2019 local election.

Israel 
Israeli citizens may vote regardless of their current resident status. However, in practice, Israeli expats are required to travel to Israel in order to vote, because voting is only possible in ballot boxes, and ballot boxes are only set up in Israel and in the occupied Palestinian territories. (Voting outside of Israel is available to restricted groups of military and diplomatic personnel that are stationed outside of Israel.)

Italy 

Italian citizens living abroad retain the right to vote in Italian parliamentary elections and referendums. They may vote either by post or at an Italian consulate or embassy. However, for Italian citizens who live in a country which has no Italian diplomatic representation, the only way to vote is to travel to Italy to vote in person. Citizens who choose to do so are reimbursed by the Italian government for 75% of their travel costs.

The Italian Parliament reserves 12 seats for those citizens residing abroad: there are eight such seats in the Chamber of Deputies and four in the Senate of the Republic.

Japan 
Japanese citizens living abroad have been allowed to vote in Diet elections since 2005, when the Supreme Court ruled that a ban on eligible overseas Japanese citizens from voting was unconstitutional. Citizens can vote either by post or at their local Japanese embassy or consulate.

Luxembourg 
Luxembourgish citizens living abroad may vote in parliamentary elections and referendums, but not local elections.

Malta 
Maltese citizens may only vote if they are physically present in Malta on election day. There is no rule forbidding expatriate citizens from voting, but they may only vote if they return to Malta in person to do so, at their own expense. There have been attempts and petitions to allow Maltese citizens living abroad to vote by post.

Mexico 
Starting in 2021, former residents are allowed to vote for an expatriate representative in the Mexico City Congress.

Morocco 
Only Moroccan citizens living in Morocco are able to vote in the elections.

Namibia 
Namibian citizens living abroad have been allowed to vote in national elections since 2014, when amendments were made to the Electoral Act 2009, Namibian expatriates may vote at temporary registration points, usually set up at Namibian embassies or high commissions.

Netherlands 
Dutch citizens who live abroad (and have deregistered as Dutch residents) are allowed to vote in elections for the House of Representatives and for the European Parliament, but cannot vote in municipal or provincial elections. They must register as voters in order to vote from abroad.

New Zealand 
New Zealand citizens living abroad have full voting rights with no expiry date as long as they have lived in New Zealand for at least one year continuously at some point in their lives and have visited New Zealand within the last three years. If you do not return within three years you temporarily lose all voting rights.

Nigeria 
Nigerian citizens living abroad have full voting rights, however, these rights have not been enacted as the National Assembly and Independent National Electoral Commission are yet to come to an agreement on how to actualize expatriate voting. In 2021, Minister of State for Foreign Affairs Zubairu Dada reiterated the Government's intent to enact diaspora voting, albeit not in time for the 2023 Nigerian general election.

Pakistan 
Overseas voting was enabled during the creation of Pakistan due to citizens being based in neighbouring countries and for economic migrants. But it was then banned. Imran khan in 2018 tried and restarted the overseas voting. But then the PDM government banned it again in 2022.

Peru 
Peruvian citizens living abroad aged between 18 and 70 must vote, as Peru's policy of compulsory voting includes expatriate Peruvians. Nevertheless, the penalty fee for failing to vote is automatically waived for all Peruvians abroad. Voting is possible, but not mandatory, for Peruvian expatriates aged over 70. Peruvian expatriates have the right to vote in presidential (first and second round) elections, congressional elections, and election for representative to the Andean Parliament as well as national referendums in the consulate where they are registered. As of 2021, two members of Congress come from the international constituency and are elected exclusively by citizens living abroad.

Philippines 
Under Republic Act No. 9189 (also known as the Overseas Absentee Voting Act of 2003), Filipino citizens living abroad are allowed to vote, with no expiry date.

Poland 
Polish citizens can vote abroad in the presidential elections, parliamentary elections, Elections to the European Parliament and referendums but cannot in the local elections. In the 2020 Polish presidential election, there were 169 polling districts abroad (the largest number: 15 in Germany, 11 in the UK, and 9 in the USA) plus 4 polling districts on ships and another 4 on oil platforms; in the 2019 Polish parliamentary election, there were 320 polling districts abroad (the largest number: 54 in the UK, 48 in the USA, and 23 in Germany) plus 5 polling districts on ships and oil platforms; in the 2019 European Parliament election, there were 195 polling districts abroad plus 3 polling districts on ships and oil platforms; in the 2015 Polish referendum, there were polling districts in 86 countries abroad plus on some ships.

Portugal 
Article 49 of the Portuguese Constitution grants all Portuguese citizens the right to vote, regardless of where they live.

Portugal has a Council of Portuguese Communities (Conselho das Comunidades Portuguesas), a consultative body which is part of the Portuguese government and represents the interests of Portuguese citizens living abroad.

4 seats of the Portuguese Parliament (out of 230) are reserved for those living abroad: 2 mandates allocated for Europe, the other 2 from outside Europe.

Romania 
Romanian citizens living abroad may vote in presidential, parliamentary and European Parliament elections. For presidential elections, they can vote by registering for a postal vote or by going to a polling station abroad. For parliamentary elections, expat Romanians are represented in Parliament by 4 deputies and 2 senators.

Singapore 
Singaporean citizens living abroad may vote in presidential and parliamentary elections, with no expiry date. 

Prior to 2023, they may only vote in person at one of ten designated overseas polling stations, located in various places such as Australia (Canberra), China (two polling stations: Beijing and Shanghai), Japan (Tokyo), Hong Kong, the United Arab Emirates (Dubai), the United Kingdom (London) and the United States (three polling stations: New York City, San Francisco and Washington, D.C.). Each citizen is assigned to an overseas polling station depending on where they live. Expatriate citizens are also assigned a polling station in Singapore, where they can vote in person if they happen to be in Singapore on election day.

In 2023, an amendment to the Presidential Elections Act and Parliamentary Elections Act was tabled in Parliament that enables Singaporeans living abroad to vote by post in subsequent elections, giving them an additional option.

South Africa 
Pursuant to Chapter 1, Section 10 of Electoral Act 73 of 1998, South African citizens living abroad retain the right to vote in national elections, with no expiry date. Expatriate citizens wishing to vote must do so in person at a South African embassy, consulate or high commission.

Spain 
Article 68, Section 5 of the Spanish Constitution guarantees Spanish citizens living abroad the right to vote. They may do so either at a Spanish consulate or embassy, or by post.

Spain has a General Council of Spanish Citizenship Abroad (Consejo General de la Ciudadanía Española en el Exterior, CGCDE), an advisory body which represents the interests of Spanish citizens living abroad.

Sweden 
Swedish nationals living abroad are automatically entitled to vote in Riksdag elections and European Parliamentary elections (for those living in another EU Member State) up to ten years after leaving Sweden. There is no time limit to eligibility, but after the initial 10-year period has elapsed, Swedish expatriates must renew their electoral roll registration by filling out a form every 10 years. They cannot vote in either county or municipal elections. Voting take place either by post or at Swedish embassies. Citizens who have never lived in Sweden are not entitled to vote.

Switzerland 
Swiss citizens living abroad may vote, with no expiry date, in elections for the National Council (lower house of parliament) and in federal referendums, provided that they register with the relevant Swiss representation abroad. Their eligibility to vote in elections for the Council of States (upper house of parliament) and in cantonal and municipal elections depends on the law of the canton in which the person was registered before leaving Switzerland.

Taiwan
Expatriate suffrage is limited to overseas citizens who have once had household registration in the “Free Area”, and voting is possible only for presidential elections. There is no provision for absentee voting. Voters wanting to exercise this right need to apply to be on the electoral roll before each election; this can be done by post. Then they must physically return to vote at their own polling stations on polling day.

Tunisia 
Tunisian expatriates have been granted the right to vote in presidential elections since 1988, and additionally in parliamentary elections since the Tunisian Revolution in 2011. The number of diaspora representatives in the Tunisian parliament is proportional to the size of the diaspora, which makes Tunisia unique.

Turkey 
Turkish non-resident citizens have been able to vote in presidential, parliamentary elections and referendums from their country of residences since 2012.

Tuvalu 
Tuvaluan citizens residing abroad may vote in Tuvaluan elections if they have been resident in Tuvalu for two of the last three years, or if they own land in the electoral district in which they are registered.

United Kingdom 
British citizens living abroad can vote in general elections and referendums, with no time limit. The Elections Act 2022 removed the previous rule whereby British citizens residing abroad could vote for up to 15 years after ceasing to live in the UK. This rule was a hotly debated topic among British expatriates who had lived abroad in European Union Member States for more than 15 years at the time of referendum on European Union membership, and were thus barred from voting in it despite arguably being more affected by the result than British people living in the UK. The Government intends that registration of overseas electors will be possible from Autumn 2023. It's expected they will be able to vote in 2024.

United States 
US citizens living abroad enjoy full federal voting rights, regardless of how long they have lived abroad. In addition, 38 states, plus the District of Columbia, allow US citizens who have never resided in the US to vote in the respective state based on where, at a minimum, their parent or legal guardian last resided. However some states restrict overseas voters to vote only in federal elections (Presidential, etc.) or vote only if the voters have not registered or voted in another state previously. These states include:
Alaska (only federal elections)
Arizona
California (only if voter has not registered or voted in any other state)
Colorado
Connecticut (only federal elections)
Delaware (only federal elections)
District of Columbia
Georgia 
Hawaii
Illinois (only federal elections)
Iowa
Kansas
Kentucky
Maine
Massachusetts
Michigan
Minnesota (only federal elections)
Montana
Nebraska (only if voter has not registered or voted in any other state)
Nevada (only if voter has not registered or voted in any other state)
New Hampshire
New Jersey
New Mexico
New York (only federal elections)
North Carolina
North Dakota
Ohio
Oklahoma
Oregon (only if voter intends to reside in Oregon, have a parent, legal guardian, or spouse that is a military or overseas voter under Oregon law, and that parent, legal guardian, or spouse last resided in Oregon)
Rhode Island (only federal elections)
South Carolina
South Dakota (only if voter has not registered or voted in any other state)
Tennessee
Vermont
Virginia (only if voter has not registered or voted in any other state)
Washington
West Virginia
Wisconsin (only federal elections)
Wyoming
As of September 6,  2022, in addition to the five U.S. territories, the following 12 states do not allow U.S. citizens who have never resided in their state to vote from there: Alabama, Arkansas, Florida, Idaho, Indiana, Louisiana, Maryland, Mississippi, Missouri, Pennsylvania, Texas, and Utah.

Voting in federal elections for President, Vice President, and U.S. Congress has no influence on one’s tax profile or status. A vote will not trigger residency or tax filing requirements.

Additionally the Democratic Party, through its overseas arm Democrats Abroad, has a Global Presidential Primary for US expats. This primary sends its own delegation to the Democratic National Convention. All eligible to vote US citizen expats who are members of Democrats Abroad are eligible to vote in the primary.

References 

 
Expatriates